Massachusetts Board of Retirement v. Murgia, 427 U.S. 307 (1976), was a United States Supreme Court case in which the Court held a Massachusetts law setting a mandatory retirement age of 50 for police officers was Constitutionally permissible.

Facts
Robert Murgia was forcibly retired from his career as a Massachusetts police officer, based on that state's Gen. Laws Ann. c. 32, § 26 (3) (a), mandating retirement by the age of 50. Murgia brought suit against the state arguing that the law violated the Equal Protection Clause of the United States Constitution. The United States Court of Appeals for the First Circuit eventually concluded that the law lacked a rational basis in furthering state interests, and held the statute unconstitutional.  The case was appealed to the Supreme Court.

Judgment
In a per curiam opinion, the court held that rational basis was the appropriate standard for this question of equal protection, and that the age limit was rationally related to a legitimate state interest. As a result, the court held § 26 (3) (a) to be constitutional.

Justice Thurgood Marshall penned the lone dissent in the case, arguing that the Court's "two-tier" model of equal protection scrutiny was inappropriate and that this case should be judged under an intermediate level of scrutiny, although that term "intermediate scrutiny" was not used in the dissent. He said the following.

See also
US labor law

Notes

External links 
 
 

1976 in United States case law
United States Supreme Court cases
United States Supreme Court cases of the Burger Court
Retirement in the United States
United States equal protection case law
United States public employment case law